The 1963 Notre Dame Fighting Irish football team represented the University of Notre Dame during the 1963 NCAA University Division football season.

Schedule

Source:

Personnel

Team players drafted into the NFL

References

Notre Dame
Notre Dame Fighting Irish football seasons
Notre Dame Fighting Irish football